The following lists events that happened during 1962 in Chile.

Incumbents
President of Chile: Jorge Alessandri

Events

February
The third edition of the Viña del Mar International Song Festival is held.

March
23 March - The Chilean land reform begins, which is developed until 1973

April
15 April - The Estadio Carlos Dittborn is inaugurated in the city of Arica.

May
15 May - The Floral clock of the city of Viña del Mar is inaugurated.
30 May-17 June – 1962 FIFA World Cup

June
2 June - The so-called Battle of Santiago occurs, where Chile faces Italy,  Chile wins 2-0.

August
8 August - The Sunday Show program begins to be broadcast, which would later become Sábado Gigante , known worldwide in countries with Spanish-speaking people.

September
16 September - The Municipal Estadio Ester Roa Rebolledo is inaugurated in the city of Concepción.
18 September - The Chilean rodeo becomes a national sport.

Births
12 February – Alberto Plaza, singer-songwriter
16 February – Alejandro Hisis, footballer 
20 February – Klaus von Storch, aerospace engineer
21 February – Marco Antonio Figueroa, footballer
21 February – Ricardo Lagos Weber, politician
21 June – Víctor Hugo Castañeda, football manager
14 July – Patricio Toledo, footballer
17 July – Patricio Mardones, footballer
24 August – Manuel José Ossandón, politician
21 September – Fernando Larraín, actor
5 October – Juvenal Olmos, football manager
7 December – Solange Lackington, actress
12 December – Luis Gnecco, actor
28 December – Renato Munster, actor

Deaths
14 March – Jorge González von Marées, politician and author (born 1900)
Date unknown
Carlos de Rokha, poet and writer (b. 1920)

References 

 
Years of the 20th century in Chile
Chile